To be wakeful is to experience the metabolic state of catabolism.

Wakeful may also refer to:

 HMS Wakeful, the name of two ships of the Royal Navy and one planned one, including:
 HMS Wakeful (R59), a Royal Navy destroyer
 Wakeful (horse), an Australian Thoroughbred racehorse

See also
 Awake (disambiguation)
 Awaken (disambiguation)
 Awakened (disambiguation)
 Awakening (disambiguation)
 Waking (disambiguation)